Kedrovy (masculine), Kedrovaya (feminine), or Kedrovoye (neuter) is the name of several inhabited localities in Russia.

Urban localities
Kedrovy, Tomsk Oblast, a town in Tomsk Oblast
Kedrovy, Yemelyanovsky District, Krasnoyarsk Krai, a settlement in Yemelyanovsky District, Krasnoyarsk Krai

Rural localities
Kedrovy, Chelyabinsk Oblast, a settlement in Kurginsky Selsoviet of Nyazepetrovsky District of Chelyabinsk Oblast
Kedrovy, Chunsky District, Irkutsk Oblast, a settlement in Chunsky District, Irkutsk Oblast
Kedrovy, Ust-Ilimsky District, Irkutsk Oblast, a settlement in Ust-Ilimsky District, Irkutsk Oblast
Kedrovy, Kemerovo Oblast, a settlement under the administrative jurisdiction of the city of oblast significance of Tayga, Kemerovo Oblast
Kedrovy, Khanty-Mansi Autonomous Okrug, a settlement in Khanty-Mansiysky District of Khanty-Mansi Autonomous Okrug
Kedrovy, Beryozovsky District, Krasnoyarsk Krai, a settlement in Yesaulsky Selsoviet of Beryozovsky District of Krasnoyarsk Krai
Kedrovy, Kozulsky District, Krasnoyarsk Krai, a settlement under the administrative jurisdiction of the work settlement of  Kozulka, Kozulsky District, Krasnoyarsk Krai
Kedrovy, Nizhneingashsky District, Krasnoyarsk Krai, a settlement under the administrative jurisdiction of the work settlement of  Pokanayevka, Nizhneingashsky District, Krasnoyarsk Krai
Kedrovy, Magadan Oblast, a settlement in Susumansky District of Magadan Oblast
Kedrovy, Omsk Oblast, a settlement in Imshegalsky Rural Okrug of Tarsky District of Omsk Oblast
Kedrovy, Primorsky Krai, a railway station in Khasansky District of Primorsky Krai
Kedrovaya, Republic of Buryatia, a settlement at the station in Tankhoysky Selsoviet of Kabansky District, Republic of Buryatia
Kedrovaya, Krasnoyarsk Krai, a village in Tubinsky Selsoviet of Krasnoturansky District of Krasnoyarsk Krai

de:Kedrowy
ru:Кедровый